Amapalea is a monotypic genus of spiders in the family Trechaleidae. It was first described by Silva & Lise in 2006. , it contains only one species, Amapalea brasiliana found in Brazil.

References

Trechaleidae
Monotypic Araneomorphae genera
Spiders of Brazil